Voynovo is a village in Chernoochene Municipality, in Kardzhali Province, in southern-central Bulgaria. It covers an area of 2.133 square kilometres and as of 2007 it had a population of 13 people.

References

Villages in Kardzhali Province